Monique Deveaux is a Canadian philosopher. She is a Full Professor and Tier 1 Canada Research Chair in Ethics and Global Social Change at the University of Guelph. She is known for her research on poverty, cultural pluralism and global justice.

Education
Deveaux completed her Bachelor of Arts and Master of Arts degrees in political theory from McGill University before enrolling at Cambridge University for her M.Phil. and PhD. Following her PhD, Deveaux became a postdoctoral research fellow at the Wiener Center for Social Policy at the John F. Kennedy School of Government at Harvard University.

Career

Williams College
Upon completing her fellowship, Deveaux joined the faculty at Williams College as an assistant professor in political science in 1998. In this new role, she continued to write on issues of moral theory and eventually published her first book Cultural Pluralism and Dilemmas of Justice in 2000. In this book, Deveaux searches for a way to provide "justice amid diversity" by arguing for deliberative liberalism. Following this publication, Deveaux accepted a Radcliffe College fellowship from 2001-02 where she developed and wrote her second book; Traditional Cultures and Liberal Constitutions. Upon returning to Williams College following her fellowship, she was named a 2002–03 Oakley Fellow for the fall semester. Deveaux was granted tenure at Williams in 2004. During her first three years as a tenured professor, Deveaux co-edited and published two books; Gender and Justice in Multicultural Liberal States and Sexual Justice/Cultural Justice. In these books, she explores the tensions between multicultural, liberal democracies and cultural and religious customs. Her first book, Gender and Justice in Multicultural Liberal States, received the 2008 C.B. Macpherson Prize. In 2010, Deveaux was promoted to the rank of full professor of political science.

University of Guelph
Deveaux left Williams College in 2010 to become a Tier 1 Canada Research Chair in Ethics and Global Social Change. In this role, she used a Social Sciences and Humanities Research Council grant to organize a conference on global ethics and fairness. In 2017, Deveaux was renewed as a Tier 1 Canada Research Chair.

Books
 Poverty, Solidarity, and Poor-led Social Movements, Oxford University Press, 2021
 Gender and Justice in Multicultural Liberal States,  Oxford University Press, 2006
 Cultural Pluralism and Dilemmas of Justice, Cornell University Press, 2000
 Exploitation: From Practice to Theory, Monique Deveaux and Vida Panitch (eds), Rowman & Littlefield, 2017
 Introduction to Social and Political Philosophy, Omid Payrow Shabani and Monique Deveaux (eds.), Oxford University Press, 2014
 Reading Onora O'Neill, M. Deveaux, D. Archard, D.Weinstock & N. Manson (eds.), Routledge, 2013
 Sexual Justice/Cultural Justice: Critical Perspectives in Political Theory & Practice, M. Deveaux, B.Arneil, R. Dhamoon, & A. Eisenberg (eds.), Routledge 2007

See also
Feminist ethics

References

External links

Political philosophers
Philosophy academics
Academic staff of the University of Guelph
Living people
Year of birth missing (living people)
Canadian philosophers
McGill University alumni
Canadian ethicists
Alumni of the University of Cambridge
Canada Research Chairs